Dave Clauss is an American recording and mixing engineer. He has won four Latin Grammy Awards for his work with artists such as Draco Rosa, Maná, Carlos Vives, and Shakira, winning Album of the Year for Rosa's Vida (2013) and Record of the Year for Vives' and Shakira's "La Bicicleta" (2016). He has also received a Grammy Award for Best Latin Pop Album for producing Shakira's album El Dorado (2017).

Awards 
2018: Grammy awards Winner, Shakira's "El Dorado" for Latin Album of the Year
2018: Grammy awards nominee, Lady Antebellum's "Heartbreak" for Country Album of the Year
2018: Grammy awards nominee, Raquel Sofia's "2 AM" for Latin Pop Album
2018: Grammy awards nominee, Orishas's "Gourmet" for Best Latin Rock, Urban, or Alternative Album
2018: Latin Grammy Awards nominee, Beatriz Luengo "Cuerpo y Alma" for Best Contemporary Pop Vocal Album
2018 Latin Grammy Awards nominee, Carlos Vives, "Vives" for Contemporary Tropical Album
2018 Latin Grammy Awards nominee, Raquel Sofia, "2AM" for Best Singer/Songwriter Album
2017: Latin Grammy Awards nominee, Shakira's "El Dorado" for Album of the Year
2017: Latin Grammy Awards nominee, Shakira & Maluma "Chantaje" for Record of the Year
2017: Latin Grammy Awards winner, Shakira's "El Dorado" for Pop Album of the Year
2016: Latin Grammy Awards Winner, Shakira & Carlos Vives "La Bicicleta" for Record of the Year
2016: Country Music Award nominee, Maren Morris's "Hero" for Album of the Year
2016: Country Music Award nominee, Maren Morris's "My Church" for Song of the Year
2015: Latin Grammy Awards Winner, Maná's "Cama Incendiada" for Best Album Pop/Rock
2013: Latin Grammy Awards Winner, Draco Rosa's "Vida" for Album of the Year

Discography

References

1987 births
American audio engineers
Grammy Award winners
Latin Grammy Award winners
Living people